Judith and Holofernes is a painting by the French artist Valentin de Boulogne, from 1626, as a close copy of a similar painting by Artemisia Gentileschi.

The painting is an oil on canvas and measures 137 x 178 cm. It is in the collection of MUŻA in Valletta, Malta.

References

External links
 http://www.wikigallery.org/wiki/painting_212229/Jean-de-Boulogne-Valentin/Judith-and-Holofernes

1626 paintings
Paintings by Valentin de Boulogne
Paintings in Malta
Paintings depicting Judith
Paintings about death
Christian art about death